The 2004 United States presidential election in West Virginia took place on November 2, 2004, and was part of the 2004 United States presidential election. Voters chose 5 representatives, or electors to the Electoral College, who voted for president and vice president.

West Virginia was won by incumbent President George W. Bush by a 12.86% margin of victory. Prior to the election, 8 of 12 news organizations considered this a state Bush would win, or otherwise considered as a red state, while others considered it a swing state. Democratic President Bill Clinton easily won this state in 1992 and 1996, but Bush carried the state in 2000 with just 51.92% of the vote. West Virginia is the only state to vote against George H. W. Bush both times and vote for George W. Bush both times. On election day, President Bush won here with a 6.53% better margin than his performance in 2000, signaling that the state was trending Republican at the presidential level. This was despite the fact that more than 50% of the state's population were registered Democrats, and both senators were Democrats.

This also marked the last election in which West Virginia voted for the same presidential candidate as neighboring Virginia, and the first election since 1944 in which West Virginia voted more Republican than Virginia. Since then, West Virginia has voted for the Republican presidential candidate while neighboring Virginia has voted for the Democratic candidate. , this is the last election in which Fayette County, Brooke County, Logan County, and Mingo County voted for the Democratic candidate. Bush was the first Republican since William McKinley to carry West Virginia twice.

Campaign

Predictions
There were 12 news organizations who made state-by-state predictions of the election. Here are their last predictions before election day.

Polling
Early on, pre-election polling showed the election as a pure toss up. But after September 14, Bush pulled away and reached 50% or higher in the polls. The final 3 poll average showed Bush leading 50% to 44%.

Fundraising
Bush raised $527,380. Kerry raised $627,425.

Advertising and visits
Bush visited the state 8 times. Kerry visited the state 6 times. A total of between $100,000 to $550,000 was spent each week. As the election went on, both tickets spent less and less here each week.

Analysis
More than any other state, West Virginia highlighted Kerry's trouble in Appalachian America. It swung heavily to the Democrats during the days of Franklin D. Roosevelt and remained reliably Democratic for most of the next 68 years. It often voted for Democrats (such as Jimmy Carter and Mike Dukakis) who went on to big national defeats. This was largely due to its blue-collar, heavily unionized workers, especially coal miners, who favored Democratic economic policy. Starting with George W. Bush, however, the state's voters became more receptive to Republicans.

Results

By county

Counties that flipped from Democratic to Republican
Harrison (Largest city: Clarksburg)
Kanawha (Largest city: Charleston)
Lincoln (Largest city: Hamlin)
Wyoming (Largest city: Mullens)

By congressional district
Bush won all 3 congressional districts, including two held by Democrats.

Electors

Technically the voters of WV cast their ballots for electors: representatives to the Electoral College. WV is allocated 5 electors because it has 3 congressional districts and 2 senators. All candidates who appear on the ballot or qualify to receive write-in votes must submit a list of 5 electors, who pledge to vote for their candidate and his or her running mate. Whoever wins the majority of votes in the state is awarded all 5 electoral votes. Their chosen electors then vote for president and vice president. Although electors are pledged to their candidate and running mate, they are not obligated to vote for them. An elector who votes for someone other than his or her candidate is known as a faithless elector.

The electors of each state and the District of Columbia met on December 13, 2004, to cast their votes for president and vice president. The Electoral College itself never meets as one body. Instead the electors from each state and the District of Columbia met in their respective capitols.

The following were the members of the Electoral College from the state. All 5 were pledged for Bush/Cheney:
 Rob Capehart
 Doug McKinney
 Dan Moore
 Richie Robb
 Larry Faircloth

References

West Virginia
2004
2004 West Virginia elections